Shuja ul-Mulk Jalala (born 1952), also known as Ghulam Rasul, is a politician in Afghanistan. He was the governor of Kunar Province, appointed by President Hamid Karzai on July 15, 2013 after a suggestion by the Independent Directorate of Local Governance (IDLG).

Early life and education 

The third son of ‘Abdu’l Malik Khan of Jalala, Shujah ul-Mulk Jalala was born in Ghaziabad District of Kunar Province in 1952. He remained in this district through the completion of his primary education, and he received his high school education in the provincial capital, Asadabad.

Career 
During the Soviet–Afghan War, Jalala joined the Mujahideen and served as a commander. He also developed political ties with the National Islamic Front of Afghanistan led by Hazrat Sibghatullah Mujadidi, and was a member of the 2002 Emergency Loya Jirga after the United States overthrew the Taliban regime. Following a February 2013 NATO airstrike in Shigal district in eastern Kunar that resulted in civilian casualties, Jalala was sent by President Karzai to lead a delegation for the purpose of investigating the incident and delivering condolences from the president to the grieving families.

In the 2005 Wolesi Jirga Election, Jalala received the third most votes from Kunar Province; thus from 2005–2011, Jalala served as a Member of the National Assembly (MNA) for Afghanistan. He then operated as Presidential Advisor for Tribal Affairs from 2011–2013.

Governor of Kunar Province 
He was appointed the Governor of Kunar Province on July 15, 2013.

As governor, Jalala expressed a desire to improve a variety of social conditions in Kunar. His priorities were peace and reconciliation, anti-corruption, and counter-narcotics, but other objectives included increasing the availability of safe drinking water in Asadabad, reducing timber smuggling, and maintaining a commitment to girls' education. With international military support on the decline in Kunar, Jalala acknowledged that tackling these social issues would not be easy, saying: 

Jalala is also the president of the Jalala Foundation, a public welfare organization.

Family background 

Shuja ul-Mulk Jalala belongs to the famous Katoor Dynasty which has ruled an independent Kingdom of Chitral since 1560 and is the great grandson of King Aman ul-Mulk II, a Mehtar of Chitral who ruled from 1858-1892. The ninth son of Aman ul-Mulk II, 'Abdu’l Rahman Khan of Jalala, emigrated from Chitral, in what is now Pakistan, to Afghanistan in 1892 after the murder of some of his brothers. With support from the rulers of Kabul, he settled at Jalala in Kunar, within the Kunar Valley.

References 

Governors of Kunar Province
People from Kunar Province
1952 births
Pashtun people
Living people
National Islamic Front of Afghanistan politicians